Star Academy Arab World or Star Academy Arabia, is a pan-Arab televised talent show, which has aired since 2003. The show features a group of young male and female candidates who are selected from a pan-Arab pool of more than three-thousand and are sequestered for four months in "The Academy," a four-story building in Lebanon, where they live, train, and compete against one another every week. The show became an instant success and an everyday much-watched event across the Arab world.

The show was adapted from a French show of the same name and is produced by Dutch company Endemol, Vanilla Productions & PAC Ltd. Star Academy Arab World is based on the Spanish format Operación Triunfo.

The show centers around the 16 candidates who compete in weekly talent competitions, singing, dancing, and acting during on-stage performances. At the end of every week, one contestant is kicked off by a public vote by the viewers.

One of the show's highlights are the appearances of some of the Arab World's most important performers such as Najwa Karam, Diana Haddad, Haifa Wahbe, Elissa, Angham, Assala Nasri, Ramy Ayach, Myriam Fares, Kazem Al Saher, Nawal Al-Zoghbi, Marwan Khoury, Carole Samaha, Ehab Tawfik, Wael Kfoury, Sherine, Fares Karam, Abdallah Al Rowaished, Saad Lamjarred and many more. The show has also been successful for its reinvention and continuous changes, just as, starting from the third season, the show witnessed guests from international superstars such as Julio Iglesias, Anggun, Karl Wolf, Tina Arena, Chris De Burgh and Massari.

Overview
Based in Adma, a city north of Beirut, Lebanon, the show is aired for 4 months on the Egyptian TV station CBC and on the Lebanese terrestrial channel LBC and is hosted by Hilda Khalife. The show follows 16 candidates through their weeks living in "The Academy," training with "teachers," and performing their talents in live on-stage shows. While many choose to sing, talents are not restricted to vocal performances; acting and dancing are also common talents.

The show takes on a few different formats depending on the day of the week. Every day, there is a one-hour "access" show that goes over the day's important and exciting events. On Friday, there is a live performance show where the candidates compete against each other, sometimes alongside famous domestic and international stars, and are voted off one by one. In addition, viewers can tune into "The Academy" 24/7 by watching LBC Reality, a dedicated satellite station.

The concept of the show is training the students in several disciplines: singing, acting, sports, vocalizing, theatre expression, dancing, and musical culture. Then, each Monday, the three weakest students are nominated. The nomination is done by the teaching staff after the candidates undergo an evaluation test the day before Sunday. On Friday, a special live show called "Prime" is broadcast. During the prime show, the candidates perform and sing either by themselves or with guest artists. The three nominated candidates' initial voting is through the public, done by either phone calls or text messages. The one with the highest percentage of votes returns. The two remaining candidates are then voted on by their fellow candidates, and the one with the most votes remains. The other candidate has to leave the academy immediately. When the overall number of candidates is reduced, the nomination by the professors comes down to two students. At this point, it's completely up to the public to vote who is in and who is out, as the remaining candidates do not vote.

The show proved to be immensely popular. As both the LBC and CBC stations provide satellite connections to more than two dozen Arab countries and also to Arab communities throughout the world, it became one of the most popular shows in the Arab-speaking world. In Saudi Arabia in particular, Star Academy was a media event so popular that its broadcasts achieved record ratings, emptied streets in major cities like Jedda, animated debates, inspired Mosque sermons, and widely distracted students from focusing on final exams in May 2004. (Al-Humaydan, 2005) CBC And LBCI, the networks airing the show, reaped huge profits from the show but have been unable to replicate the show's success with other reality shows.

This debate also caused the indefinite postponing of West Asian edition of Big Brother, also known as Big Brother – Al Raiss.

Reception

Conservative response

While the show is immensely popular among viewers, especially in Saudi Arabia, many conservative and religious leaders have criticized the show for promoting anti-Islamic behavior and ideals. Star Academy has sparked intense debates over the role of Islam in public life, Western cultural influence, gender relations, and political participation and has subverted Wahhabi notions of social order. In response to countless questions from religious Saudi viewers who questioned whether or not it was religiously haram (prohibited) or halal (permitted) to watch the show and participate in the voting component of Star Academy, the Permanent Committee for Scientific Research and the Issuing of Fatwas issued a related fatwa (religious ruling) that prohibited watching, discussing, voting in, or participating in Star Academy, as well as urging businessmen not to finance this or any similar show.

According to the Committee, the fatwa was issued because the show carried a number of serious issues including "free mixing of the sexes," "the wanton display and unveiling on the part of the women displaying their charms," and blatant promotion of immorality by "making Muslims get used to seeing these shameful scenes that provoke desires and by distancing them from good morals and virtues." The Committee also declared that simply not watching the show was not sufficient; it is also the duty of all practicing Muslims to advise those who watch or take part in the show that it is against religious law.

Many individuals have also spoken out against the show, citing religious reasoning as well. An Imam as Mecca’s Great Mosque called Star Academy a "weapon of mass destruction." Sahwi activists distributed a series of audiocassette sermons entitled "Satan Academy" while still others created similar sermons that compared the reality show to the virulent virus that had caused severe respiratory syndrome in the population. Religious leaders were not the only one to speak out against the show, though. Al-Riyah published a number of hostile op-eds entitled "Star Academy: A Corrupt Satellite Industry" and "Star Academy… The Other Terrorism" that harshly criticized the show.

Liberal response

While there was much criticism of the show by the area’s more conservative members of society, many liberals praised the novel approach to television media. Numerous reporters in Saudi newspapers praised Star Academy as an alternative to the extremist dogma that had taken over mass media in the nation. In their view, the show acted as an invitation to dialogue as well as an inspiring lesson in democracy. In a column entitled "Star Academy’s Democracy" a female Saudi journalist wrote that "Arabs sheid away from voting because …[of fraud]… until satellite television… corrupted us by inciting us to vote: "vote you are the referee"…"nominate your favorite candidate"…the Arab viewer has become obsessed with voting because results resemble election results in the United States, where unlike Arab elected, no body wins by 99.9 percent but rather by logical proportions." 

Other liberals were exasperated by the conservatives’ excessive reaction to Star Academy. Another female journalist writing for Arab news asked "how vulnerable must we be if a TV program can ‘destroy our moral standards and teach our children bad things." 

A major liberal voice hailed from within the royal family when Prince Al-Waleed Bin Talal, a major stakeholder in LBC, supported Star Academy by sending his private plane to Beirut to bring the winner back to Saudi Arabia.

A "Patriot Night"

On 14 February 2005, Rula Sa'd, the Director of Marketing and Promotions at the LBC acted in her role as "Director of the Academy" to announce to the contestants that Rafiq al-Hariri had been assassinated and that Lebanon was in mourning. This was one of the only instances in the show's history that a real-life event had intruded upon The Academy. Like other Lebanese channels, LBC suspended its regular programing to focus all attention on the aftermath of the assassination, including a ten-day hiatus of Star Academy. The show resumed on Friday, 25 February with an episode that critics deemed "The Patriotic Night" during which the contestants, along with Arab celebrities and contestants from past seasons came together and sung a number of patriotic songs in solidarity with the mourning nation. Not once throughout the program was al-Hariri's name said; instead, the show was made to be a demonstration of renewed patriotism.

Major controversy began when it came time to vote off that week's losing contestant. That week, the three nominees for expulsion included a Bahraini man Ahmad Salaheddin, a Syrian woman Joey Bassous, and a Lebanese man, Samer Doumit. Per contest rules, the public votes to save one contestant, and the remaining two are voted for by the other non nominated contestants. The Bahraini man was rescued by the public, but the Syrian women, despite getting higher ratings than Doumit by the public, was ultimately voted off the show.

The ousting was said to echo the tension that already existed between Syria and Lebanon post-assassination, as there was widespread suspicion that the Syrians were implicated in the crime.

Winners

The winners for the various series were:
Star Academy 1 (2003–2004):  Mohamed Attieh 
Star Academy 2 (2004–2005):  Hisham Abdulrahman
Star Academy 3 (2005–2006):  Joseph Attieh
Star Academy 4 (2006–2007):  Shatha Hassoun
Star Academy 5 (2008):  Nader Guirat
Star Academy 6 (2009):  Abdulaziz Abdulrahman
Star Academy 7 (2010):  Nassif Zeitoun
Star Academy 8 (2011):  Nesma Mahgoub
Star Academy 9 (2013–2014):  Mahmoud Mohy 
Star Academy 10 (2014):  Mohamed Chahine 
Star Academy 11 (2015–2016):  Marwan Youssef

Teachers
 Academy Director:Roula Saad (Seasons 1 to 8) / Claudia Marchelian (Seasons 9 to 11)
 Contestant Supervisor: Fouad Fadel
 Voice Instructor: Wadih Abi Raad / Khalil Abu Obeid / Hicham Boulos/ Carla Ramia
 Music Instructor: Michel Fadel/ Amir Theyma
 Vocalize Instructor: Mary Mahfoud/ Pierre Samia
 Dance Instructor: Alissar Caracalla/ Hadi Awada
 Drama Instructor: Betty Taoutel/ Gabriel Yammine/ Aida Sabra
 Fitness Instructor: George Assaf ( change annually )

Seasons

Star Academy 1 
The first season of Star Academy 1 made its debut in early December 2003. The first season ended on 4 April 2004. The winner was the Egyptian candidate, Mohammad Attia.

The inaugural show quickly became popular and tickets for the show became harder to get as the show went on. The students, particularly the Top 8, became household names, and those that made the Top 8 became instant stars. The eight finalists were Mohammad Attia (Egypt), Bashar Al Shatty (Kuwait), Sophia El Mareekh (Morocco), Bahaa' El Kafy (Tunisia), Ahmed El Sherif (Tunisia), Myriam Attallah (Syria), Mohammad Khalawi (Saudi Arabia) and Cynthia  Karam (Lebanon). The teachers were as follows: Wadih Abi Raad, Michael Fadel, Mary Mahfouth, Betty Taoutel, Aida Sabra, Elissar Karakalla and Rola Saad.
At the end of the show, an album featuring the Top 8 was released, as well as a music video for the winner. They then went on a Pan Arab tour, performing concerts in Dubai, Kuwait, Cairo, Alexandria, Amman, Damascus, and Beirut.

Many of them released albums, ranging in various degrees of success. Bashar Al Shatty (Kuwait) has gained much success in his three albums which he released over the last five years. Also being crowned as the most successful teenage singer in the Persian Gulf region was added to his success of being the Star Academy finalist. However, the most successful was Ahmed El Sherif (Tunisia), despite coming in the 5th place. His album has been the most successful among all student from Star Academy.

 Mohammad Attia (Winner; released one album)
 Bashar Al Shatti (Finalist; released three albums)
 Bahaa' El Kafy (3rd place; released one album)
 Mohammad Khalawi (4th place; released one album)
 Ahmed El Sherif (5th place; released two albums)
 Sophia El Mareekh (6th place; released one album)
 Cynthia Karam (7th place; no albums released)
 Myriam Attallah (8th place; released multiple songs & albums)

The candidate that took the 9th place, Bruno Tabbal, participated in the "World Best" contest that englobed about 11 countries that have this reality show in their country. He took the 10th place, and the French person, Elodie Frégé, won.

Primes

: As there was a tie, Sophia had the casting vote and she saved Bruno.
: One week after the beginning of the program, She was chosen to participate in the program because of the withdrawal of the Syrian candidate Wafaa due to some pregnancy problems.
: As there was a tie, Amine had the casting vote and he saved Yasser.

Tour

Mohamad A, Bashar, Bahaa, Ahmad, Mohamad K, Sophia, Cynthia, and Myriam (the Top 8) were chosen to be part of the tour.

Star Academy 2 

Hisham, from Saudi Arabia, was declared as the winner this year, even though he was not the critic's favorite. He is also the winner with the most nominations in the show's history, with a record 4 nominations. Most felt that Amani or Zizi were the better performers overall. Many also felt that this year was a step-down in the quality of students from the previous year, with only Amani, Zizi, and Ahmed being deemed good singers.

Primes

Tour

Hisham, Amani, Zizi, Ahmad H, Bashar G, Katia, Samer, and Salma (once again, the Top 8) were chosen to be part of the tour.

Star Academy 3

Joseph Attieh, who is a radio and TV production student received a trophy, $50,000 in cash and a brand new 2006 car. He was 19 years old and the first Lebanese to win the Title. This year was seen as an improvement over the previous year, and a return to the level of the first season, with many talented students. Some like Hani, Hanaa, and Shayma were deemed just as worthy of winning as Joseph. There were also many other strong performers like Fadi, Khalifa, Rakiya, Maya, and Wajdi.

This year, the show expanded the number of students from 16 contestants, in the two previous years, to 19 students.

Primes

: As there was a tie, Mohammad Ibrahim had the casting vote and he saved Mohamed Dossary
: As there was a tie, Rym had the casting vote and she saved Mohammad Ibrahim
: As there was a tie, Chayma had the casting vote and she saved Mohammad Ibrahim
: He withdrew from the academy after being nominated and saved by his colleagues vote and not by the public's vote

Tour

Joseph, Hani, Hanaa, Chayma, Fady, Khalifa, Maya, Rakiya and Wajdi were chosen to be part of the tour. This was the first year 9 students instead of 8 went on tour. It was also the first time where the Top finishing students did not all go on tour. Despite finishing 8th and 9th, Rym and Mohammed I were not chosen for the tour, Rakiya and Wajdi were selected to go on tour instead.

Star Academy 4
Shada Hassoun, from Iraq, made history by being the first girl to take the title.

The fourth season (2007) was also the first season where two girls claimed the first and second place when Shada Hassoun came in first, and Marwa (from Tunisia) came in second. It was also noteworthy to feature the first female contestant from the Persian Gulf, Shoroq (from Bahrain), as well as the first contestant from Oman, Ayoub.
 
Primes

: As there was a tie, Salwa had the casting vote and she saved Aline
: As there was a tie, Tahra had the casting vote and she saved Bassel
: As there was a tie, Tahra had the casting vote and she saved Asma
: As there was a tie, Badreia had the casting vote and she saved Zeina
: There were rumors that the lines in Iraq to vote for Rahma were free of charge on certain days

Tour

Nassif, Rahma, Mohamed R, Ramy, Badria, Sultan, Asma, Tahra, Mahmoud, Zeina, Abdulaziz,  Miral and Rayan were chosen to be part of the tour, but following the shocking and unexpected death of Ramy, the tour was cancelled.

Star Academy 8 

Nesma Alaa Ali Mahgoub, a 20-year-old student from Egypt, was the winner this year. She is the second Egyptian to win in the show, after Mohamed Atieh, the second female contestant to win, after Shada Hassoun, and also the second candidate to win in the Arab show by singing mostly the western genre, after Nader Guirat.
 
: As there was a tie, Karim had the casting vote and he saved Nina.
: As there was a tie, Ahmad had the casting vote and he saved Husam.
: The results were not shown. However, the presenter, Hilda Khalife, said that Ahmad got 96%.

Star Academy 9 
Star Academy Arabia returned with a brand new name after a hiatus of over a year. The series began on 26 September 2013 and ended on 9 January 2014, and was produced by Endemol Middle East. It aired on three channels including LBCI and CBC Egypt.
The contestants of this series were, in order of elimination: 
1. Menna Hany
2. Marita Abi Nader
3. Issa Almarzoug
4. Taher Mostafa
5. Mayssa Mejri
6. Maria Sarkis
7. Nour Farawati
8. Lilia Ben Chikha
9. Zaki Chreif
10. Mosab Al Khateeb
11. Abdallah Abd Al Aziz
12. Rana Samaha
13. Soukaina Boukries
14. Jean Chahid
15. Zinab Oussama
16. Mahmoud Mohey (Winner)

Star Academy 10

The winner of Star Academy 10 made history by being the first contestant from a country that already had a student win from it. Mohammed Chahin from Egypt became the 4th Egyptian to win the title, and the 3rd consecutive one after Mahmoud Mohey in Season 9 and Nesma Mahgoub In Season 8 .

Primes

Star Academy 11

Star Academy 11 began in October 2015 and ended in January 2016 with the crowning of this season's winner Marwan Youssef from Lebanon. Marwan is the second Lebanese contestant to win the first place title after Joseph Attieh (Star Academy 3). The season was produced by Endemol Shine Middle East and broadcast on Lebanese Broadcasting Corporation International aka LBC Lebanon) and Capital Broadcasting Center aka CBC (Egypt) tv networks. Among many other prizes awarded to the winner of the season, Marwan Youssef won a song produced by Endemol, and released his first single "Watan Hobi." Marwan later went on to release a second single alone with Watary Productions record label titled "Rafed Saddek," which saw great success and lead to him filming his first music video for the song. Marwan has since performed many concerts and performed in important music festivals.  This also had a few noteworthy and historical things to mention for example, Ihab Amir made history as the first male Moroccan contestant since the first season and being the second male Moroccan contestant after Amine Errachidi in the first season. Also Algeria made history this season as this was the first time in the show's entire run that more than one contestant was chosen to represent the North African nation.

Marwan Youssef winner of star academy 11

|Public's Votes:
|Faten  6.25%%  Yousef  35.08%  Rapheal  58.67%
|soukaina  26.95%  Faten  7.62%  Hanane  65.43%
|Mabell  22.64%  Ali  41.04%  Soukaina  36.32%
|Mohameds  23.00%  Souhila  52.63%  Mortada  24.37%
|Chantal  18.21%  Mohameds  14.89%  Hanane  66.90%
|Souhila  ?  Ali  ?%  Chantal  ?%
|Hanane  63.23%  Dena  22.16%  Chantal  14.60
|Haidy 53.67%  Ali  47.33%
|Anis 54.30%  Mabell  45.70%
|Rapheal 70.76  Anis  29.24%
|Ihab 48.60%  Dena  51.40%
|Dena 45.68  Rapheal  54.32% 
|Rapheal 40.57  Nassim  59.43%
|Nassim  51.12%  Hanane 48.88%
|Haidy 19.32%  Marwan 55.46%  Mohameda  6.55% Nassim  18.67%

Milestones, recordholders and trivia

Finalist Contestants:
-Star Academy 1:
.Mohamed Atteya (Egypt); Winner.
.Bashar Shatii (Kuwait).
-Star Academy 2:
.Hisham Abdulrahman (KSA); Winner.
.Amani Swisy (Tunisia).
-Star Academy 3:
.Joseph Atteya (Lebanon); Winner.
.Hani Hussein (Egypt).
.Han'a Idrissy (Morocco).
-Star Academy 4:
.Shatha Hassoun (Iraq); First Female Winner.
.Marwa Bin Sughaiyer (Tunisia).
.Mohamed Kammah (Egypt).
.Carlo Nakhla (Lebanon).
-Star Academy 5:
.Nader Guirat (Tunisia); Winner.
.Mohamed Qwidar (Jordan).
.Sa'ad Ramadan (Lebanon).
-Star Academy 6:
.Abdulaziz Abdelrahman (KSA); Second Winner from KSA .
.Bassma Bousail (Morocco).
.Ibrahim Dashti (Kuwait).
.Michel Azzi (Lebanon).
-Star Academy 7:
.Nassif Zeytoun (Syria); Winner.
.Rahma Mezher (Iraq)
.Mohamed Ramadan (Jordan).
-Star Academy 8:
.Nesma Mahgoub (Egypt); Second Winner from Egypt & Second Female Winner.
.Ahmed Ezzat (Egypt); 
.Sarah Farah (Syria);
-Star Academy 9:
.Mahmoud Mohey (Egypt); Third Winner from Egypt
.Zinab Oussama (Morocco)
.Jean Chahid (Lebanon)
-Star Academy 10:
.Mohammad Chahine (Egypt); Fourth Winner from Egypt
. Lea Makhoul (Lebanon)
.Ghada Jreidi (Tunisia)
-Star Academy 11
.Marwan Youssef (Lebanon); Second Winner From Lebanon
.Heidi Moussa (Egypt)
.Nassim Reissi (Tunisia) 
.Mohammad Abbass (Egypt)

Semi-Finalist Contestants:
-Star Academy 1: Baha'a AlKaffy (Tunis)
-Star Academy 2: ZeeZee Adel (Egypt)
-Star Academy 3: Chayma Hilali (Tunis) & Fady Andraos (Palestine)
-Star Academy 4: Sally Ahmed (Egypt)
-Star Academy 5: Shahinaz (Egypt)
-Star Academy 6: Lara Skandar (Egypt)
-Star Academy 7: Ramy Shamali (Lebanon) & Baderia Elsayed (Tunisia)
-Star Academy 8: Oumayma Taleb (Tunisia) & Gilbert Simon (Lebanon)
-Star Academy 9: Soukaina Boukries (Morocco)
-Star Academy 10: Mina Atta (Egypt)
-Star Academy 11: Hanane El Khader (Morocco)

Contestants who have won Top 1 the most in each season:
- Star Academy 1: Myriam (Syria) – 4 wins.
- Star Academy 2: Amani (Tunisia) – 2 wins.
- Star Academy 3: Hani (Egypt) – 3 wins. (Tie)
- Star Academy 4: Mohamed Kammah (Egypt) – 2 wins. (Tie)
- Star Academy 4: Shatha hassoun(Iraq) – 2 wins. (Tie)
- Star Academy 5: Nader (Tunisia) – 3 wins. (Tie)
- Star Academy 6: Bassma (Morocco) – 3 wins. (Tie)
- Star Academy 6: Aya (Egypt) – 2wins (Tie)
- Star Academy 7: Mohammed Ramadan (Jordan) – 3 wins. (Tie)
- Star Academy 8: Nisma Mahgoub (Egypt) – 2 wins. (Tie)
- Star Academy 8: Sarah Farah (Syria) – 2 wins. (Tie)
- Star Academy 8: Gilbert Simon (Lebanon) – 2 wins. (Tie)
- Star Academy 8: Mohamed Daqdouq (Syria) – 2 wins. (Tie)
- Star Academy 9: Lilia Ben Chikha (Tunisia) – 2 wins. (Tie)
- Star Academy 9: Zinab Oussama (Morocco) – 2 wins. (Tie)
- Star Academy 9: Abdallah Abd Al Aziz (Saudi Arabia) – 2 wins. (Tie)
- Star Academy 10: Mina Atta (Egypt) – 2 wins. (Tie)
- Star Academy 11: Haidy Moussa  (Egypt) – 2 wins. (Tie)
- Star Academy 11: Marwan Youssef (Lebanon) – 2 wins. (Tie)

Contestants who won the title without any nominations:
- Star Academy 3: Joseph Attieyh (Lebanon)
- Star Academy 7: Nassif Zeytoun (Syria)
- Star Academy 8: Nesma Mahgoub (Egypt)
- Star Academy 10: Mohammad Chahine (Egypt)
- Star Academy 11: Marwan Youssef (Lebanon)

Contestants who have never been chosen as nominees:
- Star Academy 2: Amani Swaisi (Tunisia)
- Star Academy 3: Joseph Attiyah (Lebanon)
- Star Academy 3: Hana'a Idrissy (Morocco)
- Star Academy 4: Marwa Bin Sughaiyer (Tunisia)
- Star Academy 4: Carlo Nakhla (Lebanon)
- Star Academy 5: Sa'ad Ramadhan (Lebanon)
- Star Academy 6: Basma Boussil (Morocco)
- Star Academy 6: Michel Azzi (Lebanon)
- Star Academy 7: Nassif Zeytoun (Syria)
- Star Academy 7: Mohamed Ramadan (Jordan)
- Star Academy 8: Nesma Mahgoub (Egypt)
- Star Academy 8: Sarah Farah (Syria)
- Star Academy 10: Mohammed Shahin (Egypt)
- Star Academy 11: Mohammed Abass (Egypt)
- Star Academy 11: Marwan Youssef (Lebanon)

Most nominated contestants in Star Academy in each season:
- Star Academy 1: Sophia (Morocco) – 4 nominations (Tie)
- Star Academy 1: Mira (Lebanon) – 4 nominations (Tie)
- Star Academy 1: Soumaya (Tunisia) – 4 nominations (Tie)
- Star Academy 2: Hisham (KSA) – 4 nominations (Tie)
- Star Academy 2: Ahmed S (Bahrain) – 4 nominations (Tie)
- Star Academy 3: Rym Ghazali (Algeria) – 6 nominations (Tie)
- Star Academy 4: Sally (Egypt) – 5 nominations (Tie)
- Star Academy 4: Ali (KSA) – 5 nominations (Tie)
- Star Academy 5: Dia'a Taybi (Morocco) – 6 nominations (Tie)
- Star Academy 6: Yehya Swiss (Jordan) – 6 nominations (Tie)
- Star Academy 7: Tahra (Morocco)- 7 nominations; More than any contestant in Star Academy history.
- Star Academy 8: Abdelsalam Mohamed (Kuwait) – 5 nominations (Tie)
- Star Academy 8: Ahmed Ezzat (Egypt) – 5 nominations (Tie)
- Star Academy 9: Nour Farawati (Syria) – 4 nominations (Tie)
- Star Academy 10: Abdelsalam Alzayid (Kuwait) – 5 nominations. (Tie)
- Star Academy 11: Raphael Jabbour (Lebanon) – 4 nominations (Tie)
- Star Academy 11: Hanane El Khader (Morocco) – 4 nominations (Tie)

Most nominated contestants' wins by Public votes:
- Star Academy 1: Mohammad Attia (Egypt)- 3 wins. (Tie)
- Star Academy 2: Hisham Abdulrahman (KSA) – 4 wins. (Tie)
- Star Academy 3: Rym Ghazali (Algeria) – 5 wins; More than any contestant in Star Academy history. (Tie)
- Star Academy 4: Ali Al-Saad (KSA)- 4 wins. (Tie)
- Star Academy 4:Maisoun Sedaki (Egypt)- 2 wins. (Tie)
- Star Academy 4:Sally Ahmed (Egypt)- 2 wins. (Tie)
- Star Academy 4:Ahmed Dawoud (Kuwait) – 2 wins. (Tie)
- Star Academy 5:Dia'a Taybi (Morocco)- 3 wins. (Tie)
- Star Academy 5:Amal Bouchoha (Algeria) – 2 wins . (Tie)
- Star Academy 5:Mirhan Hussien (Egypt)- 2 wins. (Tie)
- Star Academy 6: Lara Scandar (Egypt)- 3 wins. (Tie)
- Star Academy 6: Mohammad Serag (Egypt)- 3 wins. (Tie)
- Star Academy 7: Tahra (Morocco)- 5 wins; More than any contestant in Star Academy history. (Tie)
- Star Academy 8: Abdelsalam Mohamed (Kuwait) – 4 wins. (Tie)
- Star Academy 8: Ahmed Ezzat (Egypt) – 4 wins. (Tie)
- Star Academy 8: Karim Kamel (Egypt) – 3 wins. (Tie)
- Star Academy 9: Taher Mostafa (Egypt) – 2 wins. (Tie)
- Star Academy 9: Rana Samaha (Egypt) – 2 wins. (Tie)
- Star Academy 9: Soukaina Boukries (Morocco) – 2 wins. (Tie)
- Star Academy 10: Abdelsalam Alzayid (Kuwait) – 4 wins. (Tie)
- Star Academy 11: Hanane El Khader (Morocco) – 3 wins . (Tie)
- Star Academy 11: Raphael Jabbour (Lebanon) – 3 wins. (Tie)

Most nominated contestants' wins by Students votes:
- Star Academy 1: Mira Mikhail (Lebanon)- 2 wins. (Tie)
- Star Academy 4: Nelly Ma3to2 (Lebanon)- 3 wins. (Tie)
- Star Academy 5: Zaher Saleh (Palestine)- 3 wins. (Tie)
- Star Academy 5: Amal el Ma7lawy (Tunisia)- 3 wins. (Tie)
- Star Academy 6: Yehia Soweis (Jordan)- 4 wins; More than any contestant in Star Academy history.
- Star Academy 8: Layan Bazlamit (Palestine)- 3 wins. (Tie)
- Star Academy 9: Nour Farawati (Syria)- 3 wins. (Tie)

Highest percentage of public votes ever achieved by each season:
Star Academy 1: Bashar Shatti (Kuwait): 78.20%
Star Academy 2: Hisham Abdulrahman (KSA): 85.04%
Star Academy 3: Fady Andraos (Palestine): 67.08%
Star Academy 4: Abdul Aziz-Alaswad (Kuwait): 64.25%
Star Academy 5: Mohamed Qwidar (Jordan) : 73.91%
Star Academy 6: Lara scandar (Egypt): 64.91%
Star Academy 7: Rahma Mezher (Iraq): 69.96%
Star Academy 8: Ahmed Ezzat (Egypt): 81.88%
Star Academy 9: Soukaina Boukries (Morocco): 77.31% 
Star Academy 10: Ibtissam Tiskat (Morocco): 75.84%
Star Academy 11: Raphael Jabbour (Lebanon): 70.76%

Contestants that left from first nomination:
-Star Academy 1:
. Nisrine (Lebanon)
. Youssef (UAE)
. Leila (Lebanon)
. Myriam (Syria)
. Cynthia (Lebanon)
. Baha2 (Tunisia)
-Star Academy 2:
. Randa (Egypt)
. Hanan (Morocco)
. Joy (Syria)
. ZeeZee Adel (Egypt)
-Star Academy 3:
. Jihan (Morocco)
. Shadya (Morocco)
. Marwa (Egypt)
. Rokaya (Egypt)
-Star Academy 4:
. Khaled (Bahrain)
. Entesar (Tunisia)
. Tina (Lebanon)
-Star Academy 5:
. Omar (Iraq)
. Fawaz (Kuwait)
. Mostafa (Lebanon)
. Shahinaz (Egypt)
-Star Academy 6:
. Jaber (Bahrain)
. Meteb (Saudi Arabia)
. Diala (Palestine)
. Aya (Egypt)
-Star Academy 7:
. Jack (Lebanon)
. Haitham (Saudi Arabia)
. Rayan (Lebanon)
. Ramy (Lebanon)
-Star Academy 8:
. Mohamed Q. (Jordan)
. Lamya (Tunisia)
. Yasmine (Morocco)
. Mohamed Raf. (Jordan)
. Efram (Lebanon)
. Oumayma (Tunisia)
-Star Academy 9:
. Marita (Lebanon)
. Menna (Egypt)
-Star Academy 10:
. Ichraq Qamar (Tunisia)
. Rita (Lebanon)
-Star Academy 11:
. Youssef (Syria)
. Murtada (Iraq)
. Ihab (Morocco)

Contestants that eventually signed with Rotana:
 Star Academy 1: 5th place: Ahmad Al Sharief Tunisia : Released two albums with Rotana, the first being in 2005 and the second in 2009.
 Star Academy 1: 2nd place: Bashar Al Shatti Kuwait : After his second studio album, he withdrew from the company, due to the lack of care and promotion on his claim. He is currently with ARM.
 Star Academy 2: Winner: Hisham Abdulrahman Saudi Arabia, He had a movie produced by the company titled Kaif Al Hal, and a duet released with Mais Hamdan.
 Star Academy 2: 2nd place: Amani Swaissi Tunisia, Left Rotana in 2009 and joined Melody.
 Star Academy 2: 3rd place: ZeeZee Adel Egypt : The most successful candidate from all the graduates, she has signed the most valuable contract which included 5 albums, 3–4 music videos each and a single release anytime she chooses, ZeeZee's debut album and her second album have enjoyed high commercial success.
 Star Academy 2: 4th place: Ahmad Hussain Kuwait : His debut album hasn't enjoyed much success, as he focused on his acting career, even though he just released his second album.
 Star Academy 2: 5th place: Bashar Ghazawi Jordan : Had signed a contract in which he and 3 other candidates from the same season would share an album with each of them having 2 singles in it.
 Star Academy 2: 6th place: Katya Haraky Lebanon :Had signed a contract in which she and 3 other candidates from the same season would share an album with each of them having 2 singles in it.
 Star Academy 2: 7th place: Samer Domat Lebanon : Had signed a contract in which he and 3 other candidates from the same season would share an album with each of them having 2 singles in it.
 Star Academy 2: 8th place: Salma Ghazali Algeria : Had signed a contract in which she and 3 other candidates from the same season would share an album with each of them having 2 singles in it. She's the only one out of the 4 that shared an album altogether, that eventually got signed by the company for a solo album.
 Star Academy 2: 12th place: Bashar Kaisi Iraq : He was signed as a presenter of Khaleeji chart show that ran for a year in 2007.
 Star Academy 3: 3rd place: Hana'a Idresy Morocco : She announced on various interviews that she signed a contract with the company which she's currently preparing for, as part of a series of albums.
 Star Academy 3: 4th place: Chayma Hilali Tunisia : She released a duet with Lebanese singer Assi Hilani which was produced by the company, though her current status with the company is unknown.
 Star Academy 5: 5th place: Abdullah Al-Dosery Saudi Arabia : He announced, in January 2009, that he signed a contract with the company to produce 5 albums.
 Star Academy 5: 9th place: Amel Bshousha Algeria : Amal has agreed to host the most important chart show in the Arab World which aired for 3 consecutive months then stopped. Her current status is unknown.
 Star Academy 5: 11th place: Bader Saudi Arabia : He signed a contract in which he only had one single produced by the company without a music video to promote it.
 Star Academy 5: 15th place: Khalid Bu Sakher Kuwait : He signed a contract which only had one single produced by the company without a music video to promote it.

Countries

References

Sources

External links
Official site
Star Academy Arabia on YouTube
Official LBCI Website
Official CBC Egypt Website

Star Academy
Arab culture
2003 Lebanese television series debuts
Reality television articles with incorrect naming style
2000s Lebanese television series
2010s Lebanese television series
Lebanese Broadcasting Corporation International original programming